This is a list of properties on the National Register of Historic Places in the U.S. state of Vermont.

Current listings by county 

The following are approximate tallies of current listings by county. These counts are based on entries in the National Register Information Database as of April 24, 2008 and new weekly listings posted since then on the National Register of Historic Places web site. There are frequent additions to the listings and occasional delistings and the counts here are approximate and not official.  New entries are added to the official Register on a weekly basis.  Also, the counts in this table exclude boundary increase and decrease listings which modify the area covered by an existing property or district and which carry a separate National Register reference number.  The numbers of NRHP listings in each county are documented by tables in each of the individual county list-articles.

See also
 List of National Historic Landmarks in Vermont
 List of bridges on the National Register of Historic Places in Vermont

References

External links 

National Register of Historic Places Travel Itinerary for Central Vermont

Vermont